The Arabian himri (Carasobarbus apoensis) is a species of ray-finned fish in the genus Carasobarbus. It is endemic to Saudi Arabia in wadis in the Hijaz Mountains which either drain into the Red Sea or inland.

References 

Carasobarbus
Fish described in 1977